Ramiro Moliner Inglés (born 13 March 1941) is a Spanish prelate of the Catholic Church who spent his career working in the diplomatic service of the Holy See.

Biography
Ramiro Moliner Inglés was born on 13 March 1941 in Castelserás, Province of Teruel, Spain. He studied at the seminary of Zaragoza and was ordained a priest on 19 March 1965. He earned a doctorate in social sciences at the Pontifical Gregorian University. At the  Pontifical Ecclesiastical Academy he studied diplomacy 1970 to 1973. His early assignments in the diplomatic service of the Holy See took him to New Zealand, Ecuador, Costa Rica, Brazil, Uruguay, Sudan, and Great Britain.

Pope John Paul II appointed him on 2 January 1993 Titular Archbishop of Sarda and Apostolic Nuncio to Papua New Guinea and the Solomon Islands.  He received his episcopal consecration on 22 February from Cardinal Antonio María Javierre Ortas.

On 10 May 1997, John Paul named him Apostolic Nuncio to Guatemala.

On 17 January 2004, John Paul appointed him Apostolic Nuncio to Ethiopia and Djibouti and Apostolic Delegate to Somalia.

Pope Benedict XVI appointed him apostolic nuncio to Albania on 26 July 2008.

He retired on 1 September 2016.

See also
 List of heads of the diplomatic missions of the Holy See

References

External links 

 Catholic Hierarchy: Archbishop Ramiro Moliner Inglés 

Apostolic Nuncios to Papua New Guinea
Apostolic Nuncios to the Solomon Islands
Apostolic Nuncios to Ethiopia
Apostolic Nuncios to Guatemala
Apostolic Nuncios to Djibouti
Apostolic Nuncios to Albania
Apostolic Nuncios to Somalia
People from the Province of Teruel
1941 births
Living people